Choi In-hoon (13 April 1936 – 23 July 2018) was a South Korean novelist and professor of creative writing at Seoul Institute of the Arts from 1977 to 2001. He is well-known for his 1960 novel The Square, which depicts "the troubled life of a Korean prisoner of war (POW) who ends up taking his own life amid an intensified ideological rift in the post-Korean War era." He won the 2011 Park Kyong-ni Prize.

Life
Choi In-hoon was born on 13 April 1936 in Hoeryong, North Hamgyong Province, which is now in North Korea. When the Korean War broke out in 1950, he took refuge with his family to South Korea aboard a U.S. Navy landing ship. He was admitted to the college of Law at Seoul National University in 1952. He did not finish his academic work; instead, he joined the army without completing the final semester of his college studies. He served as an English interpreter and TI&E (troop information & education) officer for seven years until he was discharged in 1963. From 1977-2001 he served as a Professor of creative writing at Seoul Institute of the Arts.

Choi died from colorectal cancer in Goyang on 23 July 2018.

Work
While still in the military, Choi made his literary debut. Most of his work centers on individuals suffering from the ideological conflicts centering on Korean national separation. He is both prolific and controversial. His most famous work is The Square, which was published in 1960 and immediately became successful.

The Square was published on the heels of the Student Revolution on April 19, 1960. This revolution overthrew President Syngman Rhee and Choi was one of the first novelists to publish in that era. Consequently, it is regarded as having been the starting point for a new era in Korea's modern literature.

The successor to The Square was A Grey Man, which also focused tightly on issues of current politics in South Korea, particularly "the  political decadence that culminated in the ouster of Syngman Rhee".

Works in translation
Reflections on a Mask, Homa & Sekei Books (2002, Stephen Moore and Shi Chung Park, tr.)
A Grey Man, Si Sa Yong O Sa Pub (1988, Chun Kyung-ja, tr.)
The Square, Spindlewood (Sep 1985, Kevin O'Rourke, tr.)
House of Idols, Jimoondang Publishing Company (Feb 2003, John Holstein and Chun Kyung-ja, tr.)

Works in Korean (partial)

Novels
 Reflections on a Mask 
 The Square (1960)
 A Dream of Nine Clouds (1962)
 A Grey Man (1963)
 Journey to the West (1966)
 The Sound of Laughter (1967)
 One Day in the Life of Kubo the Novelist (1969)
 Typhoon (1973)
 The Keyword (1994)

Plays
 Where Shall We Meet Again? (1970)
 Shoo-oo Shoo Once Upon A Time (1976)

Essays
 Meditation on the Road (1989)

Awards
1966, Dong-in Literary Award
1977, Best Playwright Prize, Baeksang Arts Awards
1978, Meritorious Prize in the Arts Category of the JoongAng Cultural Awards
1979, Seoul Theater Critics Group Award 
1994,   
2011, Park Kyong-ni Prize
2004, Distinguished Alumnus Award of Seoul National University's College of Law

References

External links
 Interview with Choi at Korea Journal
 Review of House of Idols at KTLIT

1936 births
2018 deaths
Deaths from cancer in South Korea
Deaths from colorectal cancer
People from Hoeryong
South Korean novelists
Seoul National University alumni
Academic staff of Seoul Institute of the Arts
Academic staff of Korea National University of Arts